The Mühlviertler Schnellstraße (S10) is an expressway (Schnellstraße) in the Austrian state of Upper Austria, scheduled to run from the Mühlkreis Autobahn (A7) at Unterweitersdorf to the Austrian-Czech border at Wullowitz near Leopoldschlag. It is part of the European route E55.

Course

Plans developed in the 1970s to continue the Mühlkreis Autobahn to Neumarkt and Rainbach were abandoned in 1983. Nevertheless, after the Revolutions of 1989 and the Fall of the Iron Curtain, the transport route from Linz to Prague gained a new significance. When the Czech government announced the construction of the D3 motorway to the border with Austria in 1993, plans for an expressway through the Mühlviertel region were resumed.

As of December 2015, a  part from Unterweitersdorf to Freistadt is open to traffic. Construction work on the remaining section from Freistadt to the Czech border has not yet started.

External links 
  Official site of project

Roads in Austria